Paul John Sweeney FIES  (born 16 January 1989) is a Scottish politician. A member of the Scottish Labour and Co-operative Party, he currently serves as Member of the Scottish Parliament (MSP) for the Glasgow region in the 6th Scottish Parliament, elected in May 2021. He previously served as Member of Parliament (MP) for Glasgow North East in the 57th Parliament of the United Kingdom, from 2017 to 2019.

Sweeney studied at the University of Stirling and University of Glasgow before working in shipbuilding and serving in the British Armed Forces within the Army Reserve. He was elected as Member of Parliament for Glasgow North East at the 2017 general election, after which he was appointed Shadow Minister for Scotland.

Sweeney lost his seat at the 2019 general election but was selected as a candidate on the Glasgow regional list for the 2021 Scottish Parliament election and was initially appointed as Shadow Minister for Trade, Investment and Innovation during the election campaign in March 2021, later being appointed as Shadow Minister for Employment and Public Finance after the election in May 2021. He was appointed as Shadow Minister for Mental Health in January 2023.

Early life and education
Sweeney was born at Stobhill Hospital in Glasgow on 16 January 1989 to Anne Patricia Sweeney (née Doherty), a bank clerk and John Gordon Sweeney, a shipyard worker. The elder of two brothers, he was brought up in Auchinairn, and Milton. Sweeney attended St. Matthew's Primary School and Turnbull High School in Bishopbriggs.

The first and only member of his family to attend university, Sweeney studied at the University of Stirling, gaining a Certificate of Higher Education with Distinction in Economics and Political Science, before continuing his degree at the University of Glasgow, where he graduated with a first class MA (Hons) in Economic History and Political Science in 2011, achieving the prize for best joint honours performance in Economic History, including a research project on the post-war economic development of Yarrow Shipbuilders, the Fairfield Shipbuilding and Engineering Company and Upper Clyde Shipbuilders. At university he also became involved in debating with the Glasgow University Dialectic Society, of which he is an honorary life member. He served as a trustee on the Glasgow University Union's board of management from 2013 to 2020.

Early career
At the age of seventeen, Sweeney joined the Army Reserve, initially serving in the Royal Corps of Signals with 32 Signal Regiment, before transferring to 52nd Lowland, 6th Battalion of the Royal Regiment of Scotland at Walcheren Barracks.

After undertaking an internship with BAE Systems at Portsmouth Naval Base as an undergraduate, Sweeney joined the company's graduate development programme with BAE Systems Maritime – Naval Ships in 2011, based at the Govan and Scotstoun shipyards on the Clyde, where he undertook a series of roles in production engineering and shipbuilding operations management on the Type 45 destroyer,  and Type 26 frigate programmes, including co-authoring a 2014 publication on the construction programme for the Type 45 destroyer. Whilst at BAE Systems, Sweeney also initiated a project with the Glasgow School of Art's Digital Design Studio to introduce virtual reality methods into complex naval ship design and construction.

At the end of 2015, Sweeney joined the national economic development agency Scottish Enterprise as a senior executive, working with the leadership of companies across the defence, marine, shipbuilding, aerospace and engineering sectors based in Scotland. In April 2016, he was elected as a Council Member and Fellow of the Institution of Engineers and Shipbuilders in Scotland (IESIS).

Political activism
Sweeney joined the Labour Party and Co-operative Party in 2008 and first became an active campaigner during the 2009 Glasgow North East by-election, after receiving a telephone call from Sarah Brown encouraging him to get involved.

While working in the shipyards he joined the Unite and GMB trade unions, later joining PCS whilst at Scottish Enterprise. He is also on the executive committee of the Scottish Fabian Society and a member of Open Labour, Momentum and Campaign for Socialism. Sweeney came to prominence during the 2014 Scottish independence referendum, after he organised an open letter signed by young shipyard workers opposing the break-up of the UK, and subsequently spoke at a rally alongside Gordon Brown on the eve of the referendum.

Sweeney's first experience of standing as an election candidate was in the 2016 Scottish Parliament election, where he placed twelfth on the Scottish Labour Party's regional list for West Scotland.

Parliamentary career

2017 election
At the 2017 general election he stood for Glasgow North East where a 12% swing to Labour led to him defeating Anne McLaughlin of the SNP by just 242 votes, overturning a 25% majority of 9,222 in an unexpected result, having not even prepared a victory speech. McLaughlin had taken the seat from the previous MP, William Bain of the Labour Party at the 2015 general election, and she had been elected with a 39% swing; which was the largest swing at the 2015 general election seen anywhere in the UK. The seat and its predecessors had previously been held by Labour MPs continuously since George Hardie, brother of the Labour Party's founder Keir Hardie, was elected for Glasgow Springburn in 1935.

MP for Glasgow North East
On 3 July 2017, he was appointed by Labour leader Jeremy Corbyn as the Shadow Under-Secretary of State for Scotland. He made his maiden speech to the House of Commons on 13 July 2017, during which he expressed his opposition to Conservative austerity policies that had led to a fall in living standards. During the 2017 Scottish Labour leadership election, Sweeney endorsed Richard Leonard, who was ultimately the successful candidate, having previously worked with him to co-author Scottish Labour's industrial strategy in 2016. In an interview with Ewen MacAskill of The Guardian shortly after his election, he described himself as being on the soft left of the party. He was a critic of the seven Labour MPs who defected to form Change UK in February 2019, describing them as "self-centred careerists" at a meeting which took place the following month to mark the relaunch of Tribune magazine.

Parliamentary expenses
In 2019, he was cited as the least expensive MP in Scotland by the Independent Parliamentary Standards Authority, including: constituency office costs and staff salaries, as well as London accommodation rent and travel costs.

2019 election
Sweeney lost his seat to the previous Scottish National Party MP Anne McLaughlin, at the 2019 general election with a marginal majority of 2,458 votes on a 4% swing, the closest result in Glasgow. After losing his seat, he went on to work on Angela Rayner's successful campaign in the 2020 Labour Party deputy leadership election. He later described the experience of losing his seat as, “The most spectacular sacking in recent Glasgow history. I was the only scalp in Glasgow that night. It was a fairly unpleasant experience. It's almost like a public execution. It's got a grim voyeurism to it. It's one of the few examples in society where people losing their jobs is treated like a blood sport.”

2021 Scottish Parliament election
On the one year anniversary of his defeat, Sweeney announced that he intended to stand as a Labour Party list candidate for the Glasgow region in the 2021 Scottish Parliament election. In February 2021, it was announced by LabourList that he had placed third on Scottish Labour's regional list for Glasgow, with the second highest number of votes cast by party members in the ballot, after Anas Sarwar. The regional list rankings are alternated by gender according to the party's positive action policy. After winning the 2021 Scottish Labour leadership election, Sarwar appointed Sweeney as Shadow Minister for Trade, Investment and Innovation. Sweeney was elected as an MSP for the Glasgow region in the 6th Scottish Parliament on 8 May 2021.

MSP for Glasgow
On 13 May 2021, Sweeney took an oath of allegiance confirming his place in the Scottish Parliament as MSP for the Glasgow region. He was appointed as Shadow Minister for Employment and Public Finance on 31 May 2021. He also served as member of the Scottish Parliament's Delegated Powers and Law Reform Committee and Public Petitions Committee. In January 2023, he was appointed as Labour's Shadow Minister for Mental Health and joined the Health, Social Care and Sport Committee. In September 2022, he began writing a regular fortnightly column in the Glasgow Times.

Political views and campaigns

Social security 
Paul Sweeney's initial campaigns in Parliament included opposition to the closure and merger of seven Jobcentre Plus sites in Glasgow by the Department for Work and Pensions and challenging cuts to social security benefits for those with disabilities during the transition from the Disability Living Allowance to the Personal Independence Payment. He also campaigned for justice on behalf of hundreds of local residents in Balornock impacted by mis-selling of The Green Deal home energy improvement scheme.

Facing unemployment and no income during the COVID-19 pandemic, Sweeney revealed he had begun applying for Universal Credit in May 2020, saying "The reality is, the majority of Scots are working class – if they stopped earning a salary, within two months they'd be in financial difficulties. However prestigious or seemingly privileged you are in terms of your work or identity, you're never far away from that. If more of us realised how close we are to that peril, maybe the social security system wouldn't be so punitive." He later wrote an article describing his experiences of life on social security in December 2020, stating "I will admit that I’ve occasionally had suicidal thoughts in my darker moments over the last few months." He also called for Universal Credit to be converted into a Universal Basic Income system, "A good start would be to use the simplified Universal Credit system as a universal leveller, enhancing it further to provide a guaranteed and dignified level of minimum income for all those who need it. The changes made to the system at the start of lockdown show that lives can be improved with a few lines of code added to the system to remove the onerous system of surveillance, restrictions, and sanctions."

Asylum and immigration
In November 2018, he won 'Best Scot at Westminster' in the annual Scottish Politician of the Year awards. This was partly in recognition of his lobbying of the Home Secretary and Prime Minister in asylum seeker rights cases such as that of Giorgi Kakava, a ten-year-old orphan who had been threatened with deportation following the death of his mother, the Kamil family who had been left without status for 18 years, teenage brothers Somer and Areeb Umeed Bakhsh, who were also supported by the Labour Party leader Jeremy Corbyn during a visit to Possilpark in August 2018, and trafficking victim Duc Nguyen. Sweeney was also a leader of a campaign to prevent Home Office contractor Serco evicting hundreds of asylum seekers from their accommodation across Glasgow, including a call for direct action to prevent evictions, stating "They’ve denied us the chance to raise this in Parliament by announcing this policy over recess. So without the ability to actually advocate for my constituents in Parliament, if necessary we’ll take direct action to picket and to occupy these properties to prevent evictions." He also committed Labour to ending unlimited immigration detention in prison-like facilities, including Dungavel. He has supported women's asylum seeker support charity Saheliya in a dispute over their purchase of the historic former office building at the St. Rollox railway works in Springburn from Tesco. Glasgow has the highest population of asylum seekers and refugees in the UK.

In May 2021, the Home Office arrested two men in Pollokshields leading to a mass protest surrounding the immigration enforcement van. Sweeney addressed the protest and called for Glaswegians to join the picket in support of the detained men. In December 2021, he launched a campaign to extend the Scottish National Entitlement Card eligibility for free bus travel to all asylum seekers resident in Scotland, arguing that the vast majority were fleeing wars and persecution, but until their applications are determined they are not allowed to work, are subject to "no recourse to public funds" visa restrictions and are forced to live in "slum-like" accommodation, with just over £5 a day to live on.

Armed forces and veterans
Sweeney voiced his concern to the Prime Minister, Theresa May about British participation in the April 2018 missile strikes against Syria, calling for an “internationally policed no-fly zone" over Syria to stop the regime bombing its own population. In the wake of a series of veteran suicides in the summer of 2018, including from his former regiment, Sweeney criticised the British Army and Ministry of Defence for inadequate mental health support for former soldiers, and a lack of sufficient records to establish the scale of the problem, accusing them of ‘passing the buck’ to overstretched military charities like Combat Stress. In 2019, he began a campaign with the Royal British Legion and Earl Haig Fund Scotland, backed by the Daily Record, calling on the UK Government to abolish immigration fees in the Immigration Act 2014 and Armed Forces immigration requirements as set out in the Immigration Act 1971, in order to allow over 6,000 personnel currently serving in the British Armed Forces from foreign and Commonwealth countries the free right to British citizenship, including the Brigade of Gurkhas. He served on the public bill committee that successfully oversaw the passage of the Armed Forces (Flexible Working) Act 2018 into legislation. Sweeney also successfully campaigned to restore the Highland Light Infantry memorial in Kelvingrove Park after it was vandalised in February 2019.

Appointed as Scottish Labour’s armed forces and veterans spokesman after his election as an MSP, Sweeney has been critical of the decision in the Ministry of Defence's 2021 Defence in a Competitive Age command paper to transfer the historic Royal Scots Borderers battalion from the Royal Regiment of Scotland into the new Ranger Regiment, losing its identity as a Scottish infantry unit, while cutting the size of the Black Watch battalion and also reducing the regiment's pipe bands.

Urban regeneration
A long-standing campaigner on urban regeneration issues in Glasgow and supporter of a land value tax, Sweeney raised concerns about the future of the city's historic buildings in the wake of the second Glasgow School of Art fire in June 2018, calling for an independent public inquiry into the circumstances of the disaster, whilst calling for the iconic building's full restoration, along with the neighbouring O2 ABC venue. He has also campaigned to restore historic Charles Rennie Mackintosh villas in Balgrayhill, to renovate David Hamilton's Mosesfield House in Springburn Park, where George Johnston built the first motor car in Britain, and saved the historic Provan Gasometers from demolition by their owners SGN, securing a listing protection by Historic Environment Scotland on appeal. He has proposed that the former St Enoch railway station clock, featured in the 1981 film Gregory's Girl, be returned to Glasgow from the Antonine Centre in Cumbernauld for installation in Queen Street railway station as part of its refurbishment.

Sweeney has campaigned for the compulsory purchase and demolition of the long-abandoned Talisman pub in Springburn, and successfully lobbied for a grant funding scheme to restore historic shop fronts along Saracen Street in Possilpark. He also objected to the proposed private redevelopment of the former Ruchill Hospital as inappropriate. In October 2018, he exposed a multi-million-pound scrap metal theft scandal at disused buildings in the grounds of Stobhill Hospital, later securing the commitment of NHS Greater Glasgow and Clyde to restore and illuminate the clock tower at the site, which is a prominent local landmark. In 2019 he proposed that the infamous Barlinnie Prison be saved from demolition and converted into a prison museum after it was announced that it is due to be closed by the Scottish Prison Service in 2025. In the wake of an arson attack on the historic St. Simon's Church at Partick in July 2021, he called on the Archdiocese of Glasgow to restore the building rather than demolishing it, and has also opposed the proposed demolition of the nearby Partick Baptist Church by the Baptist Union of Scotland. In December 2021, Sweeney called on Glasgow City Council planners to create a new pedestrian and cycle embankment along a former railway line at Partick Central railway station running along the River Kelvin between the Riverside Museum and Kelvingrove Park, in a similar style to Manhattan's High Line.

In September 2021, after revealing major structural defects with two concrete viaducts carrying the north flank of the M8 Glasgow Inner Ring Road at Woodside, that will cost millions of pounds to repair, Sweeney wrote a letter to Patrick Harvie, Minister for Active Travel stating, "it is my opinion the project to restore the crumbling Woodside Viaducts - an ugly concrete megastructure completed in 1971 after the mass demolition and displacement of the surrounding communities - is ill thought through and, in the year of COP 26, constitutes a colossal waste of taxpayers’ money." He has requested that the Scottish Government consider alternative infrastructure schemes, citing international New Urbanism examples of freeway removal, such as Boston's Big Dig, Octavia Boulevard in San Francisco, the Alaskan Way Viaduct replacement in Seattle, Cheonggyecheon in Seoul, Voie Georges-Pompidou in Paris and proposals for the Gardiner Expressway in Toronto. A public petition to the Scottish Parliament has since been launched, campaigning for alternatives to renewing the M8 motorway through central Glasgow.

Public transport infrastructure
A founding member of the ‘Get Glasgow Moving’ campaign in 2016, Sweeney called for the protection of the proposed route of the Glasgow Crossrail project on the former City of Glasgow Union Railway line from encroachment by residential developers on a site east of the High Street, at Collegelands and has advocated using the Glasgow City Deal to finance the delivery of the long-awaited Glasgow Airport Rail Link, as well for Glasgow Airport itself to be brought back under the city's municipal ownership. He criticised Glasgow City Council leader Susan Aitken for supporting a downgraded option to use a people mover system to the airport, instead of light rail that would be integrated with the main Paisley Gilmour Street railway station and the wider city region rail network. The Glasgow Connectivity Commission, published in April 2019, endorsed the light rail option as part of a wider Glasgow Metro network, which was supported by Sweeney, who called for greater regional powers to deliver the project. Sweeney has called for the extension of High Speed 2 north from Manchester to Glasgow, serving on the public bill committee that approved the High Speed Rail (West Midlands – Crewe) Act 2021. He also campaigned against persistent bus service cuts in the city by First Glasgow, calling for the bus system to be returned to public ownership and regulation, as Strathclyde Buses was.

Local government
Sweeney has frequently spoken out against a series of cuts to local public amenities by Glasgow City Council, including the controversial closure of the People's Palace in January 2019, and supporting community-led campaigns against the closure of Whitehill Swimming Pool in Dennistoun, as well as the city's six municipal golf courses. He also spoke out against the closure of local bank branches, post offices and credit unions, as well as to remove car parking charges at Glasgow Royal Infirmary for staff. He supports a local tourist tax to help fund public services in Glasgow. During the COVID-19 pandemic, he led calls for Glasgow City Council to abolish a 1996 by-law that bans drinking in the city's public parks and other outdoor spaces, and to license family-orientated beer gardens in the main parks to raise money for the city. Sweeney also tabled a parliamentary motion in support of a Radio Clyde campaign to install safety lighting on key routes in Glasgow's parks at night, in the wake of an incident during the COP 26 summit in November 2021, when road closures for a world leaders reception at Kelvingrove Art Gallery and Museum led to local residents being sent on lengthy detours though a darkened Kelvingrove Park.

Industrial policy
In December 2018, the planned closure of the last railway engineering works in Springburn, the St. Rollox ‘Caley’ Railway Works in July 2019 was announced by its German owner Mutares, despite the site running at a profit, with the loss of over 200 jobs. Sweeney led a campaign against the closure in concert with the Unite and RMT trade unions, lobbying both the UK and Scottish Governments to renationalise the works, and putting forward several proposals to save the site from closure, even including a plan to commission the restoration of the Springburn-built South African Class GMAM ‘Springbok’ steam locomotive, in storage at Summerlee, Museum of Scottish Industrial Life in Coatbridge, and raising the matter at Theresa May's final Prime Minister's Questions. He joined workers at the site for a rally as the final shift walked out after 163 years, on 26 July 2019. In May 2022, it was reported that an application he had made for the railway works site to be designated as listed by Historic Environment Scotland was successful, with the buildings and railway sidings awarded a category B listing.

As a GMB MP he supported local Asda workers campaigning against a forced downgrade to their employment contracts and has been involved in negotiations to prevent the closure of the Tesco supermarket in Parkhead. Sweeney also lobbied the Minister for Disabled People with the Community trade union to secure the protected places scheme at the Royal Strathclyde Blindcraft Industries in Springburn, saving over 100 jobs at the site in 2018. In August 2017, he assisted traders affected by a major fire at the Blochairn Fruit & Fish Market, the largest wholesale market in Scotland, turning over £250 million worth of produce a year.

As vice-chair of the All-Party Parliamentary Group for Shipbuilding and Ship Repair, he frequently raised matters of concern about Ministry of Defence's National Shipbuilding Strategy, co-authoring a report that was published in May 2019. He called for greater investment in improvements to the Clyde's shipyard infrastructure, a long-term continuous shipbuilding programme from Defence Equipment and Support, condemned delays to Type 31 frigate procurement, and played a leading role in the Confederation of Shipbuilding and Engineering Unions’ campaign that successfully secured a commitment from the Ministry of Defence that the Royal Fleet Auxiliary's planned Fleet Solid Support Ships are built in British shipyards. He has also questioned the commitment of Peel Ports to investment in the Firth of Clyde's Inchgreen Dry Dock due to their interest in Cammell Laird, and called for a more effective Scottish Government approach to securing the future of the troubled Ferguson Marine in Port Glasgow, criticising Caledonian Maritime Assets for their hostile approach to procuring ferries with the shipyard.

As an MSP, he has raised concerns about the Scottish Government's guarantees and loans to Sanjeev Gupta's Liberty House Group, which acquired the Lochaber hydroelectric scheme and aluminium smelter in 2016, along with the Dalzell and Clydebridge Steelworks in 2017, with a potential exposure to the government of over half a billion pounds after the failure of its main financial backer, Greensill Capital in March 2021. Sweeney led a debate at Holyrood in calling for the First Minister to support the campaign to save the McVitie's biscuit factory in Tollcross from closure after its Turkish owner, Pladis announced a plan to cease production at the site by the end of 2022, threatening 500 jobs. He also criticised Associated British Foods in July 2021 for announcing a cut of 70 jobs out of a workforce of around 90 at their Milton bakery in the north of the city.

Brexit
Sweeney campaigned for the UK to remain as a member state of the European Union during the 2016 referendum. As an MP, he was a prominent supporter of the Labour campaign for a confirmatory public vote on the terms of the Brexit withdrawal agreement, voting for that option along with staying in the Customs Union and Single Market during the Parliamentary votes on Brexit, as well as supporting the continuation of freedom of movement for workers. In leaked WhatsApp messages, the "soft Brexit" position taken by Scottish Labour in its 2019 European Parliament election campaign was criticised by Sweeney, who wrote, "If it's like this then it's a bad misjudgement and I'm having nothing to do with it... Let's hope the NEC [National Executive Committee] kill this bullshit line." Scottish Labour lost both its seats, receiving 9.3% of the vote and coming fifth behind the SNP, Brexit Party, Scottish Liberal Democrats and Scottish Conservatives respectively. In the aftermath, Scottish Labour leader Richard Leonard accepted responsibility and said he would endorse remaining in the European Union.

He was also one of 78 Parliamentarians who challenged the five-week prorogation of Parliament by Prime Minister Boris Johnson in the Court of Session. The case, together with a case brought in England and Wales by Gina Miller, was ultimately successful in the Supreme Court, resulting in the quashing of the prorogation on 24 September 2019.

UK constitutional reform
Although not in favour of Scottish independence, Sweeney has consistently called for major reform to make the UK a federal state, including greater self-government for the Greater Glasgow city region, replacing the House of Lords with an elected Senate, and electoral reform to introduce proportional representation to replace the first-past-the-post voting system for the House of Commons as a member of the Labour Campaign for Electoral Reform. He has suggested that any future independence referendum should not be a binary vote as in 2014, but instead take the form of a multi-option referendum.

Education reform
Sweeney has called for all private schools in Scotland to be stripped of their charitable status and integrated with the state sector, saying in 2019: “Not only should these private businesses catering to elitist attitudes towards education not be the privileged beneficiaries of tax breaks for perfunctory charity work, but all private schools should be brought, en masse, into the state sector. We should take the grubby pound sign out of British education altogether and open it up to everyone to have access because at the moment it is not available to 93% of people.” The policy of private school integration was later adopted at the 2019 Labour Party Conference.

Drug reform
A supporter of drug policy reform whilst an MP, in March 2020 Sweeney announced that he was supporting activist Peter Krykant in his efforts to open an unsanctioned supervised overdose prevention site in Glasgow in an effort to persuade the Lord Advocate and Scottish Government to introduce a legal framework to regulate their official operation, in a similar manner to needle and syringe programmes, by demonstrating that the Misuse of Drugs Act 1971 does not make it illegal to allow someone to consume controlled drugs on a premises. It started operating in September 2020. Scottish Labour has since adopted a policy in favour of drug decriminalisation. In May 2022, Mr Sweeney launched a consultation on his proposed private member's bill, the Drugs Death Prevention (Scotland) Bill, in response to drug related deaths in Scotland. This bill would create a licensing framework to enable the establishment of Overdose Prevention Centres following the unsanctioned supervised drug consumption pilot run by Peter Krykant in Glasgow  In November 2022, he won 'Community MSP of the Year' at The Herald's Scottish Politician of the Year awards for his work on the drugs death crisis, including a bill to establish overdose prevention centres.

Coronavirus pandemic 
In May 2021, amid a spike in COVID-19 cases, Sweeney raised the idea of partitioning levels of public health restrictions within Glasgow, using the River Clyde as a boundary between the north and south of the city.

Belt and Road Initiative 
Sweeney is a critic of the Belt and Road Initiative, describing it as having an "ulterior motive" of "recycling chronic domestic Chinese trade surpluses into an external loan sharking scheme, creating a sphere of debt-fuelled dependence and influence across the global south." after China took ownership of Entebbe International Airport from Uganda after they defaulted on loans from the scheme to expand the airport.

Outside politics
Sweeney has an interest in built heritage and architectural issues in Glasgow. He is a director of the Glasgow City Heritage Trust, a member of Glasgow Building Preservation Trust and has led walks as part of Glasgow Doors Open Days Festival for several years. Sweeney was also involved in the restoration of the historic former Govan shipyard head offices into the Fairfield Heritage Centre in 2014, for which he won an award, and the restoration of the 'Light and Life' sculpture on the former headquarters building of the Scottish Co-operative Wholesale Society in the Kingston district of Glasgow in 2016. In 2021, he became a trustee of The Egyptian Halls SCIO, a Scottish Civic Trust project to save the Alexander 'Greek' Thomson masterpiece.

After campaigning against the demolition of Springburn Public Halls in 2012, he founded the Springburn Winter Gardens Trust, which is working to restore the nearby historic glasshouse in Springburn Park. An £8 million restoration programme by Collective Architecture to convert the building into a major events and performance venue was unveiled by the Trust in October 2020.

In February 2019, the Daily Record reported that an unnamed Scottish MP had made a formal complaint that Scottish Conservative MP Ross Thomson had groped them in Strangers' Bar in October 2018, in the wake of a similar incident that was alleged to have occurred earlier that month. The Daily Mail named Sweeney as the complainant in November 2019, leading to the chairman of Thomson's local Conservative Association refusing to sign the nomination papers to allow him to stand as a Conservative candidate for Aberdeen South in the December 2019 general election. Thomson's former civil partner also came forward to cite similar instances of behaviour. The Times reported in February 2020 that the investigation had been widened to include a further allegation of a similar nature. In July 2020, Sweeney branded the investigation process "shambolic" and "not fit for purpose". In October 2020, the Parliamentary Commissioner for Standards ruled that the allegation of sexual assault was not upheld by the available evidence. The Commissioner found there was evidence Thomson put his arms around Sweeney and inappropriately invaded his personal space while drunk but ruled there was insufficient evidence to prove beyond reasonable doubt that this behaviour was sexual in nature. It has since been reported that Sweeney is appealing the ruling.

References

External links 

Personal website
 

 
 

1989 births
Living people
Scottish people of Irish descent
People educated at Turnbull High School
Alumni of the University of Glasgow
Alumni of the University of Stirling
Scottish Labour MPs
BAE Systems people
UK MPs 2017–2019
Members of the Parliament of the United Kingdom for Glasgow constituencies
People from Bishopbriggs
People from Springburn
Springburn
Labour MSPs
Members of the Scottish Parliament for Glasgow constituencies
Members of the Scottish Parliament 2021–2026
Royal Regiment of Scotland soldiers